Ron Wallace (born in Pompano Beach, Florida) and raised in Kansas City, Missouri, is an American country music singer-songwriter. Wallace was signed to Sony/Columbia Records and charted one single on the Billboard Hot Country Singles & Tracks chart. He released an EP, It Must Be Love, independently in late March 2015.

Career
Wallace moved to Nashville in 1987, where he found work as a demo singer. He sang background vocals on Faith Hill's 1993 album Take Me as I Am and Ty Herndon's 1995 debut What Mattered Most. In 1994, Wallace signed to Columbia Records. His debut single, "I'm Listening Now", was released in August 1995. Deborah Evans Price of Billboard gave the song a favorable review, writing that "Wallace has a strong voice and displays a rather moving interpretive ability." It peaked at number 65 on the Billboard Hot Country Singles & Tracks chart. Columbia released Wallace's album, Bound and Determined, on October 17, 1995. A second single, "Left Hand of God", was issued the following month.

Discography

Albums

Singles

Music videos

References

American country singer-songwriters
American male singer-songwriters
Year of birth missing (living people)
Living people
Country musicians from Missouri
People from Independence, Missouri
Columbia Records artists
Singer-songwriters from Missouri